Jesus Kibunde Kakonge (born 25 December 1979) is a Congolese former professional boxer who competed from 2004 to 2016. As an amateur, he won a gold medal at the 1999 All-Africa Games, one of his country's only two gold medals at the African Games since its name change from Zaire in 1997. He was made winner in the semi-final after his opponent tested positive for drugs, and his opponent in the final got sick with the flu and dropped out, leaving him the gold.

References

1979 births
Living people
African Games gold medalists for DR Congo
African Games medalists in boxing
Competitors at the 1999 All-Africa Games
Democratic Republic of the Congo male boxers
People from Lubumbashi
Lightweight boxers
21st-century Democratic Republic of the Congo people